The Green Party of Alberta (GPA) is a registered political party in Alberta, Canada, that is allied with the Green Party of Canada, and the other provincial Green parties. The party was registered by Elections Alberta on December 22, 2011, to replace the deregistered Alberta Greens, and ran its first candidates for office in the 2012 provincial election under the name Evergreen Party of Alberta.  The party changed its name to "Green Party of Alberta" on November 1, 2012.

History

Following a dispute of the leadership of the Alberta Greens in 2008, George Read withdrew as leader and Joe Anglin remained as interim leader. On April 1, 2009, the executive of the party failed to file an annual financial statement with Elections Alberta, as required by law, and was deregistered on July 16, 2009. Some of its members joined the Alberta Party and Wildrose Party, while others formed the Vision 2012 Society. The independent group, dedicated to green principles, formed the legal entity required by Elections Alberta to register a political party. An annual general meeting was held on June 25, 2011, in Red Deer to elect an executive, and to raise a petition asking Elections Alberta to register a new party. The petition was signed by 8,500 people, more than the required 7,000, and on December 22, 2011, the "Evergreen Party of Alberta" was registered. According to Elections Alberta rules, a party cannot use a name used by another party until the name goes unused for a general election. After contesting the 2012 general election under the Evergreen banner, the party voted at its annual general meeting, on September 29, 2012, to change its name to "Green Party of Alberta".  Elections Alberta approved the name change and it became effective 1 November 2012.

Platform
The party bases its principles on the Charter of the Global Greens. Those principles are:
 Ecological wisdom
 Non-violence
 Participatory democracy
 Respect for diversity
 Social justice
 Sustainability

Election results

Electoral record

Leaders

See also

 Alberta Greens
 Alberta Greens candidates in Alberta provincial elections
 List of Alberta general elections
 List of Green party leaders in Canada
 List of Green politicians who have held office in Canada
 List of political parties in Alberta
 Politics of Alberta

References

External links

 

2011 establishments in Alberta
Environmental organizations based in Alberta
Green Party of Alberta (2011–present)
Organizations based in Calgary
Political parties established in 2011
Provincial political parties in Alberta